Terrilimosina is a genus of flies belonging to the family of the Lesser Dung flies.

Species
T. brevipexa Marshall, 1987
T. corrivalis (Villeneuve, 1918)
T. deemingi Marshall, 1987
T. intricata Papp, 1991
T. longipexa Marshall, 1987
T. nana Hayashi, 1992
T. parabrevipexa Su & Liu, 2009
T. paralongipexa Hayashi, 1992
T. parasmetanai Su & Liu, 2009
T. pexa Marshall, 1985
T. racovitzai (Bezzi, 1911)
T. schmitzi (Duda, 1918)
T. smetanai Marshall, 1987
T. unio Marshall, 1987

References

Sphaeroceridae
Diptera of Asia
Diptera of North America
Muscomorph flies of Europe
Sphaeroceroidea genera